Rabindra Prasad Adhikari (Nepali: रबिन्द्र प्रसाद अधिकारी) (4 May 1969 – 27 February 2019) was a Nepali politician and three-time parliamentarian, belonging to the Nepal Communist Party (NCP). He was Minister of Culture, Tourism and Civil Aviation from 16 March 2018 until his death in a helicopter crash. He was the Kaski District secretary of the party. In the 2008 Constituent Assembly election, Adhikari was elected from the Kaski-3 constituency, with 13,386 votes. In the 2013 Constituent Assembly election, he was re-elected from the Kaski-3 constituency, with 15,456 votes. In 2017, CPN-UML candidate Rabindra Adhikari won parliamentary elections from Kaski Constituency No. 2. Representing the left alliance, Adhikari secured 27,207 votes to defeat Nepali Congress candidate Dev Raj Chalise, who got 18,661 votes. After his demise, his wife Bidya Bhattarai won Kaski Constituency-2 with a wide margin of 8,403 votes in the by-election. Bhattarai secured 24,394 votes, while her nearest contender Khem Raj Poudel from main opposition Nepali Congress got 15,991. Likewise, Socialist Party's Dharma Raj Gurung got 1,922 votes. He authored the books Constituent Assembly, Democracy and Re-structuring.

Political career
He became president of Free Student Union of Prithivi Narayan Campus in 1993. He became national president of All Nepal National Free Students Union, the student wing of the communist party, in 1999.

He left CPN (UML) to join the breakaway Communist Party of Nepal (Marxist-Leninist) and rejoined following reunification.

After the 2nd Constituent Assembly Election, he became the chairman of the Development Committee of the Legislature Parliament.

Electoral history
2017 House of Representatives Election, Kaski-2

2013 Constituent Assembly Election, Kaski-3

2008 Constituent Assembly Election, Kaski-3

1999 House of Representatives Election, Kaski-1

Corruption allegations
The subcommittee formed by the Public Accounts Committee of the House of Representatives to probe the Nepal Airlines wide body aircraft purchase concluded that he was complicit in corruption. He died while the matter was being investigated by the Commission for the Investigation of Abuse of Authority.

Death
Rabindra Prasad Adhikari, along with six other people, died in a helicopter crash while returning from Pathibhara Devi Temple, Taplejung, Nepal, on 27 February 2019.

References

1969 births
2019 deaths
Communist Party of Nepal (Unified Marxist–Leninist) politicians
Government ministers of Nepal
People from Kaski District
Tribhuvan University alumni
Victims of aviation accidents or incidents in Nepal
Victims of aviation accidents or incidents in 2019
Victims of helicopter accidents or incidents
Nepal MPs 2017–2022
Nepal Communist Party (NCP) politicians
Prithvi Narayan Campus alumni

Members of the 1st Nepalese Constituent Assembly
Members of the 2nd Nepalese Constituent Assembly